North Merritt Island is a census-designated place (CDP) in Brevard County, Florida, United States. It occupies a portion of the physical Merritt Island, north of the CDP of Merritt Island and south of Merritt Island National Wildlife Refuge. Florida State Road 3 is the main highway through the community, leading north to Florida State Road 405 and south to Florida State Road 528.

North Merritt Island was first listed as a CDP prior to the 2020 census.

Demographics

References 

Census-designated places in Brevard County, Florida
Census-designated places in Florida